"Brave" is the second single from Idina Menzel's third studio album I Stand. The song was written by Menzel and Glen Ballard and was released on November 6, 2007. It reached the Top 20 on the Adult Contemporary chart peaking at #19 on March 29, 2008.

Music video
A music video was made in which Menzel plays a piano alone in a room. As she leaves, her dress is seen tied to the piano. She proceeds to walk through streets slowly unwrapping the dress she is wearing. The video ends with Menzel standing on top of a building taking the rest of the dress off and revealing a red top and jeans underneath.

Usage in other media
The song was used in the second-season finale of the MTV show The Hills, playing during the climatic "moving out" scene between former best friends Lauren Conrad and Heidi Montag. It was also used in the series 7 finale of Two Pints of Lager and a Packet of Crisps.

Live performances
"Brave" was performed during the I Stand tour which ran from April 1, 2008 until March 28, 2009.

Formats and track listings
U.S. Promo CD single
 "Brave" (Edit) – 3:59
 "Brave" (Album version) – 4:39
 "Brave" (Instrumental) – 4:39
 "Brave" (Acapella) – 4:39
 "Brave" (Backing Vocals) – 4:39
 "Brave" (Lead Vocals) – 4:39
 "Brave" (Acoustic version) – 4:38

UK CD single
 "Brave" (UK Mix) – 4:34
 "Gorgeous" – 3:48
 "Brave" (Acoustic version) – 4:38

U.S./UK digital single
 "Brave" – 4:39

UK digital maxi single
 "Brave" (UK Mix) – 4:34
 "Gorgeous" – 3:48
 "Brave" (Acoustic version) – 4:38
 "Defying Gravity" (Tracy Young's Flying Monkey Club Mix) – 8:02

Official versions
 "Brave" (Album version) – 4:39
 "Brave" (Acapella) – 4:39
 "Brave" (Instrumental) – 4:39
 "Brave" (Lead Vocals) - 4:39
 "Brave" (Backing Vocals) - 4:39
 "Brave" (Edit) – 3:59
 "Brave" (UK Mix) – 4:34
 "Brave" (Acoustic version) – 4:38

Credits and personnel
Vocals - Idina Menzel
Songwriting, bass, bass guitar, keyboard, electric guitar, synthesizer, strings, acoustic guitar, piano: Idina Menzel, Glen Ballard
Guitar: David Levitt, Joel Shearer
Drums: Blair Sinta
Production: Glen Ballard
Credits are adapted from the I Stand album liner notes.

Chart performance

References

2007 singles
2007 songs
Idina Menzel songs
Songs written by Idina Menzel
Songs written by Glen Ballard
Song recordings produced by Glen Ballard
Warner Records singles